The Democratic Party (PD), renamed in 1893 as the Liberal Party (PL), was a Nicaraguan political party in the 19th century. The power base of the liberal Democratic Party was in the city of León; while their conservative counterparts were centered in Granada. The Democrats were opposed to the Legitimists who expelled the Democrats from the constitutional assembly in 1853, driving them underground or into exile, and promulgated a constitution of 1854.

The Democrats rejected the constitution and the Legitimist government and fought against it with the help of filibuster William Walker.

When José Santos Zelaya came to power in July 1893, the Democratic Party was renamed the Liberal Party.

The liberal parties in Nicaragua have their roots in the historical Democratic Party.

History

Starting in 1838, Nicaraguan politics were split between the Liberal mindset that was centered in León and the opposition—the Conservative mindset—was based in Grenada. In 1909, the Democratic Party of Nicaragua discovered its first major calamity—and setback as a political party concerned with its further influence in its country—when the United States came out in favor of the Conservative Party's interests. From 1912 to 1925, the United States helped the Conservatives maintain stability from rebellious factors in Nicaragua with a small detachment of US Marines.

References

Sources
http://jrscience.wcp.muohio.edu/FieldCourses00/PapersCostaRicaArticles/CostaRicain1856.Defeating.html 
http://www.rutahsa.com/nica-05.html
Defunct political parties in Nicaragua
Liberal parties in Nicaragua